Admiral Graham may refer to:

Angus Cunninghame Graham (1893–1981), British Royal Navy admiral
Patrick Graham (Royal Navy officer) (1915–1980), British Royal Navy rear admiral
Stephen Victor Graham (1874–1955), U.S. Navy rear admiral
Walter Hodgson Bevan Graham (1849–1931), British Royal Navy admiral
William Graham (Royal Navy officer) (1826–1907), British Royal Navy admiral